Cabinet of Pyotr Stolypin – composition of the Council of Ministers of the Russian Empire, under the leadership of Pyotr Stolypin, worked from July 21, 1906 to September 18, 1911.

Stolypin's government has worked until the death of the Prime Minister, as a result of the ensuing attempt in September 1911.

Formation

Immediately after his appointment, Stolypin began talks about the invitation in new cabinet popular public and parliamentary figures belonging to the Constitutional Democratic Party and "Union of October 17". Ministerial positions originally assumed Dmitry Shipov, Georgy Lvov, Peter Heyden, Nikolai Lvov, Alexander Guchkov; in the course of further negotiations also considered candidates Anatoly Koni and Yevgeny Trubetskoy. Public figures, confident that the future 2nd State Duma may force the government to create a cabinet responsible to the Parliament, had little interest in the activities as Ministers of the Crown in a mixed public and bureaucratic office; the possibility of entering the government they are hedged by such terms and conditions, which obviously could not be taken by Stolypin. Eventually, the negotiations failed completely. As this was the third failed attempt to attract public figures in the government (the first attempt was made by Sergei Witte in October 1905, immediately after the publication of the October Manifesto, the second -. By Stolypin in June 1906, before the dissolution of the First State Duma), Stolypin as a result of completely disappointed in the idea of public office and later headed the government purely bureaucratic structure.

On assuming office, the Prime Minister Stolypin insisted on the resignation of the Ministry of Agriculture Aleksandr Stishinsky and Procurator of Alexey Shirinsky-Shakhmotov, while maintaining the rest of the composition of the previous cabinet of Ivan Goremykin.

Ministers
Composition of the cabinet is constantly changing, which was connected with the fact that the ministers did not justify expectations of Stolypin.

References

Stolypin
Cabinets established in 1906
1906 establishments in the Russian Empire